Oxyptilus mycites is a moth of the family Pterophoridae. It is found in Taiwan. The Global Lepidoptera Names Index lists it as a synonym of Nippoptilia vitis.

References

Oxyptilini
Moths described in 1914
Plume moths of Asia
Moths of Taiwan